Bertram Harold Jackson (1882–1940) was an English professional footballer who played as a left back in the Football League for Manchester City between 1907 and 1911.

Personal life 
Jackson served as a private in the Prince of Wales' Own Civil Service Rifles during the First World War.

Career statistics

Honours 
Manchester City

 Football League Second Division: 1909–10

References

English footballers
Manchester City F.C. players
English Football League players
1882 births
People from Collyhurst
1940 deaths
Luton Town F.C. players
Stalybridge Celtic F.C. players
British Army personnel of World War I
London Regiment soldiers
Association football fullbacks
Military personnel from Manchester

Southern Football League players